Bellator 285: Henderson vs. Queally was a  mixed martial arts event produced by Bellator MMA, that took place on 23 September 2022 at the 3Arena in Dublin, Ireland.

Background 
Bellator returned to Dublin for the second time in 2022, featuring Irish fighter Peter Queally in the main event against former WEC and UFC Lightweight Champions Benson Henderson.

After initially being booked for May 6, 2022 at Bellator 280 and being scrapped due to a hand injury to Manhoef, Yoel Romero and Melvin Manhoef was rescheduled for this event.

A bantamweight bout between Brett Johns and James Gallagher was scheduled for this event. However in August, it was announced that Gallagher pulled out of the bout due to unknown reasons. Jordan Winski was picked as a replacement for Gallagher.

Results

See also 

 2022 in Bellator MMA
 List of Bellator MMA events
 List of current Bellator fighters
 Bellator MMA Rankings

References 

Bellator MMA events
Events in Dublin (city)
2022 in mixed martial arts
2022 in Irish sport
Mixed martial arts in Ireland
Sports competitions in Dublin (city)
September 2022 sports events in Ireland
2020s in Dublin (city)